Lars Arne Åkesson (born 26 February 1963) is a Swedish former competitive figure skater. He is a six-time Swedish national champion and two-time Nordic champion. He competed at four World Championships, six European Championships, and the 1984 Winter Olympics in Sarajevo. At the Olympics, he placed 13th in compulsory figures, 15th in the short program, 18th in the free skate, and 17th overall. His best ISU Championship result was 9th, obtained at the 1985 Europeans in Gothenburg.

Competitive highlights

References 

1963 births
Living people
Figure skaters at the 1984 Winter Olympics
Sportspeople from Malmö
Swedish male single skaters